The Cuban long-nosed toad (Peltophryne longinasus), or Stejneger's Caribbean toad, is a species of toad in the family Bufonidae. It is endemic to Cuba and only known from three widely separated populations. 
Its natural habitats are upland pinewoods and mesic broadleaf forests. It is always found by streams. It is threatened by habitat loss caused by logging, charcoaling, fires, and agricultural expansion.

References

longinasus
Amphibians of Cuba
Endemic fauna of Cuba
Taxonomy articles created by Polbot
Amphibians described in 1905